The 2013–14 Segunda Liga, also known as the Liga Revolução by Cabovisão for sponsorship reasons, was the 24th season of the second-tier of football in Portugal. A total of 22 teams played in the league in this season.

Moreirense and Penafiel were promoted to the 2014–15 Primeira Liga, while Aves played (and lost for 2–0 on aggregate) a play-off with Paços de Ferreira (classified in the 15th position in the 2013–14 Primeira Liga) for a place in the 2014–15 Primeira Liga.
Atlético stayed in the 2014–15 Segunda Liga after being invited by the Portuguese League for Professional Football (LPFP) as the 2014–15 Primeira Liga competition was expanded to 18 teams, because Boavista was reintegrated, along with the expansion of the 2014–15 Segunda Liga competition to 24 teams and also to the impossibility of a 4th place club from the 2013–14 Campeonato Nacional de Seniores to be promoted.

Events
Despite finishing in 18th place in the 2012–13 season, Naval were relegated to the Portuguese Second Division, due to financial problems.

Naval's relegation allowed Sporting da Covilhã to be invited back to the Segunda Liga.

Teams

Stadia and locations

Personnel and kits

Note: Flags indicate national team as has been defined under FIFA eligibility rules. Players and Managers may hold more than one non-FIFA nationality.

Managerial changes

League table

Positions by round

Results

Season statistics

Top goalscorers

Updated: 12 May 2014, 00:16 (UTC)

Hat-tricks

Awards

Monthly awards

SJPF Segunda Liga Player of the Month

SJPF Segunda Liga Young Player of the Month

References 

Liga Portugal 2 seasons
2
Por